This is a list of places in the Philippines named in honor of José Rizal, the Filipino nationalist, writer and revolutionary.

Province
 Rizal

Municipalities
 Rizal, Cagayan
 Rizal, Kalinga
 Rizal, Laguna
 Rizal, Nueva Ecija
 Rizal, Occidental Mindoro
 Rizal, Palawan
 Rizal, Zamboanga del Norte

Education
 Jose Rizal Memorial State University, in Dapitan, Zamboanga del Norte
 José Rizal University, in Mandaluyong, Metro Manila
 Rizal High School, in Pasig, Metro Manila
 Rizal Institute - Canlubang, in Calamba, Laguna
 Rizal Library, in Quezon City, Metro Manila
 Rizal National Science High School, in Binangonan, Rizal
 Rizal Special Education Learning Center, in Davao City
 Rizal Technological University, in Mandaluyong, Metro Manila
 Sentro Rizal, in Manila
 University of Rizal System, in Rizal Province
 Jose Rizal Institute in Orion, Bataan

Transportation
 J.P. Rizal Avenue, in Makati, Metro Manila
 Rizal Avenue, in Metro Manila
 Rizal Avenue, in Olongapo
 Rizal Avenue (disambiguation)
 Rizal Avenue Extension, in Malabon, Metro Manila
 Dr. Jose P. Rizal Street, in Cebu City, Cebu
 Rizal Boulevard, in Dumaguete, Negros Oriental
 Rizal Boulevard, in Santa Rosa, Laguna
 Rizal Drive, in Bonifacio Global City, Taguig, Metro Manila
 Rizal Street, in various towns and cities of the Philippines
 J.P. Rizal Street, in Tagaytay, Cavite
 J.P. Rizal Street, in various towns and cities of the Philippines

Others

 Jose Rizal Farm, in Katipunan, Zamboanga del Norte
 José Rizal Memorial Protected Landscape, in Dapitan, Zamboanga del Norte
 Rizal Memorial Baseball Stadium, in Malate, Manila
 Rizal Memorial Coliseum, in Malate, Manila
 Rizal Memorial Sports Complex, in Malate, Manila
 Rizal Memorial Stadium, in Malate, Manila
 Rizal Park, in Ermita, Manila
 Rizal Shrine, in Intramuros, Manila

Outside the Philippines

 Rizal Park, in Sydney, Australia
 Dr. Jose Rizal Monument, in Markham, Ontario, Canada
 Rizal Park, in Jinjiang, China
 Place José-Rizal, a public square in Paris, France
 José-Rizal-Straße, a street in Wilhemsfeld, Germany
 Dr. Jose P. Rizal Marg, a street in New Delhi, India
 Jalan Jose Rizal, a street in Medan, Indonesia
 Jose Rizal Monument in Bitung, Indonesia
 Parque José Rizal, in Lima, Peru
 José Rizal Monument, in Madrid, Spain
 Dr. Rizal Suite 305, a hotel suite in the Grand Oriental Hotel in Colombo, Sri Lanka. Formerly known as just Room 305, the suite was occupied by Rizal himself during his stay in the island then known as Ceylon.
 Dr. Jose Rizal Avenue, a street in Chicago, Illinois, USA
 Jose Rizal Bridge, in Seattle, Washington, USA
 Rizal Park, in Seattle, Washington, USA

See also
 Species named after José Rizal

References

 
Rizal